UUG, according to the genetic code, is Leucine.

UUG is an acronym for:
Uniface Users Group
Universal Underwriters Group
Unix User Group